The Mercedes-Benz F100 is a concept car by then Daimler-Benz unveiled at the North American International Auto Show in 1991. The goal was to show off innovations in control, design, and comfort in passenger cars.

Innovation 
Year of series production version debut is in parentheses:
Autonomous cruise control system (1999 Distronic)
Active Blind Spot Assist and Active Lane Keeping Assist (2010)
Solar cell roof (2002 Maybach 62)
low beam HID Xenon headlamps (1995)
Voice recognition (1996)
Tire-pressure monitoring system (1999)
Rain sensor (1995) 
Chip card instead of car keys (1998 Keyless Go)
Collision avoidance system (2005 radar Distronic Plus with BAS Plus)

F100